Claremont Township is located in Richland County, Illinois. As of the 2010 census, its population was 855 and it contained 377 housing units.

Geography

Demographics

References

External links
City-data.com
Illinois State Archives

Townships in Richland County, Illinois
Townships in Illinois